Pioneer was a 19th-century  paddle-steamer gunboat used in New Zealand. Built in Sydney to the order of the New Zealand colonial government by the Australian Steam Navigation Company, she cost £9,500. Launched in 1863, she was towed across the Tasman Sea by HMS Eclipse, leaving Sydney on 22 September and arriving at Onehunga on 3 October 1863.

She was a flat-bottomed, stern-wheel paddle-steamer of 304 tons, made of 3/8 inch (9.5 mm) iron. She was 42.6 m long, 6 m beam, and drew only 0.9 m fully laden for travel on the Waikato River. With twin 30 hp engines and a 3.7 m (12 foot) stern wheel she had a speed of 9 knots. She had two iron cupolas or turrets, which were pierced for rifles and 12 pdr guns. The cupolas were 2.4 m (8 feet) high and 3.6 m (12 feet) in diameter.

She was manned by officers and men of the Royal Navy, two companies from HMS Curacoa; and flew the pendant of Commodore Sir William Wiseman of Curacoa. She proved of immense service in the skirmishing on the Waikato River in 1863 during the Waikato Campaign of the New Zealand Wars.

On 24 December 1866, whilst awaiting repair, she broke her mooring at Port Waikato, drifted out to sea and, during an attempt to steam her into Manukau Harbour, was wrecked on the Manukau bar.

The two turrets are on display in Mercer (as part of the war memorial) and Ngāruawāhia. There are two engravings of her in action on the Waikato River in Ross and Howard, from the Illustrated London News.

See also
 Early naval vessels of New Zealand

References

Bibliography
Howard, Grant (1981): The Navy in New Zealand pages 11–12 (Reed, Wellington)  
Ingram, C. W. N., and Wheatley, P. O., (1936) Shipwrecks: New Zealand disasters 1795–1936. Dunedin, NZ: Dunedin Book Publishing Association.
Ross, J O’C (1967): The White Ensign in New Zealand pages 87–88 (Reed, Wellington) 
Taylor, T D (1948): New Zealand’s Naval Story pages 108-109 (Reed, Wellington) 
 Entry in the Miramar Index

Naval ships of New Zealand
Ships built in New South Wales
New Zealand Wars
1863 ships
Ngāruawāhia
Maritime incidents in December 1866
Shipwrecks of New Zealand
1866 in New Zealand